Mesudiye may refer to:

Mesudiye, Datça, a small village of Muğla Province in Turkey
Mesudiye, Mudanya
Mesudiye, Ordu, a district of Ordu Province in Turkey
Ottoman battleship Mesudiye, pre-dreadnought battleship, launched 1874, sunk in 1914